Lower Common is a village in the civil parish of Eversley in the district of Hart in Hampshire, England. Its nearest town is Yateley, approximately 3.1 miles (5 km) south-east to the village.

Villages in Hampshire